Rhacophorus baliogaster, also known as the belly-spotted frog, is a species of frog in the family Rhacophoridae. It is found in the Central Highlands of Vietnam and the Annamite Mountains of adjacent Laos. Its range probably extends into eastern Cambodia where suitable habitat should be present.

Description
The snout is obtusely pointed. The tympanum is distinct. The fingers have well-developed discs and basal webbing. The toe discs are smaller than those of fingers; the toes have extensive webbing. The dorsum is dark brown above, usually with some blackish spots running as a broken streak from the should to the groin. The flanks are lighter brown. The venter is white with conspicuous black spots.

Habitat and conservation
Individuals have been observed perched on grassy vegetation on the banks of forest streams, while tadpoles have been recorded from a swampy forest pond.

This species is not uncommon in parts of its range. It is threatened by habitat loss and degradation caused by expanding agriculture. It has been recorded in the Xe Sap National Biodiversity Conservation Area in Laos and Bidoup Núi Bà National Park in Vietnam, and its range overlaps with some other protected areas.

References

baliogaster
Frogs of Asia
Amphibians of Laos
Amphibians of Vietnam
Amphibians described in 1999
Taxa named by Ilya Darevsky
Taxa named by Robert F. Inger
Taxa named by Nikolai Loutseranovitch Orlov
Taxonomy articles created by Polbot